Argus Island was an acoustic research tower and platform located on Plantagenet Bank, a guyot about 30 miles southwest of the island of Bermuda. The tower was originally part of the facilities supporting Project Artemis and Project Trident under auspices of the Tudor Hill Laboratory, a facility of the US Navy's Underwater Sound Laboratory. Later the tower was used for additional acoustic experiments as well as oceanographic observations, wave height measurements, optical observations, air containment measurements and measurements of the effects of the ocean environment on the structure itself.

The Tudor Hill Laboratory was the terminus for a number of undersea systems supporting both passive and active sonar development and environmental and oceanographic acoustical research with shore facilities also available to visiting researchers of Navy projects with suitable clearances and funding. The laboratory was the only Atlantic Navy research and development facility with direct access to an operational Sound Surveillance System (SOSUS) facility, the adjacent Naval Facility Bermuda, allowing studies and evaluation of operational hardware. Data from the laboratory's experimental sensors was originally sent from the tower terminals to the laboratory by cable until replaced by microwave link. The laboratory had assigned vessels to serve the tower and conduct research, including the R/V Erline, a  former oil field crew boat. In 1964 the tower was used to support the Navy's Sea Lab I.

The tower was supported before Erline's acquisition in 1967 by MAC III. The support included regular supply of JP-5 fuel for the tower's diesels brought in  bladders.

The tower was four-legged with a two-story platform for crew quarters, instrumentation and support services. The tower had fuel storage, crane and a helicopter pad. Typical minimum staffing by contract personnel was eight persons, including electronic technicians, mechanics and housekeeping staff.

The prefabricated tower was designed, built and installed in 1960 by J. Ray McDermott & Company of New Orleans. In July 1966 the program was transferred to the Manager, Antisubmarine Warfare Project Office and technical responsibility transferred to the  Naval Research Laboratory (NRL). The research program was suspended on 30 June 1970 with occasional daytime inspections and maintenance work by NRL personnel. On 13 May 1976 the tower was toppled by demolition charges after which Erline conducted a fine grain grid survey to confirm no portion of the tower remained above the  level.

Footnotes

References

Bibliography

External links
 Plantagenet Bank in Undersea Features

Closed installations of the United States Navy
Buildings and structures completed in 1960
Buildings and structures demolished in 1976